Sam Wallis is an Australian rugby union player who plays for the  in Super Rugby. His playing position is flanker. He made his run on debut for the Rebels in Round 1 of the 2022 Super Rugby Pacific Season. Previously he was a member of  the Reds squad for the 2021 Super Rugby AU season, making 2 appearances.

Super Rugby statistics

Reference list

External links
Rugby.com.au profile
itsrugby.co.uk profile

Australian rugby union players
Living people
Rugby union flankers
Year of birth missing (living people)
Brisbane City (rugby union) players
Queensland Reds players
Melbourne Rebels players